Havana Candy is the second album by American vocalist and songwriter Patti Austin recorded in 1977 and released on the CTI label.

Reception
The Allmusic review stated "Austin sang this undistinguished material with as much conviction as she could muster, but the general pallid air lingering over the production also affected her vocals".

Track listing
All compositions by Patti Austin except as indicated
 "That's Enough for Me" (Patti Austin, Dave Grusin) - 5:46 
 "Little Baby" - 4:12 
 "I Just Want to Know" - 4:54 
 "Havana Candy" - 4:34 
 "Golden Oldies" - 4:41 
 "I Need Somebody" - 4:29 
 "We're in Love" - 4:00 
 "Lost in the Stars" (Maxwell Anderson, Kurt Weill) - 5:02

Personnel
Patti Austin - vocals
Alan Rubin, Marvin Stamm - trumpet
Wayne Andre - trombone
Michael Brecker, Lou Marini - tenor saxophone
Gerry Niewood - alto saxophone
Ronnie Cuber - baritone saxophone
Dave Valentin - flute, timbales
Dave Grusin - piano, electric piano, synthesizer, slide whistle, arranger, conductor
Richard Tee - piano
Eric Gale, Steve Khan, Hugh McCracken - electric guitar
Frank Gravis, Will Lee - bass guitar
Steve Jordan - drums
Ralph MacDonald - percussion
Lani Groves, Gwen Guthrie, Ullanda McCullough, Ken Williams - backing vocals
Seymour Barab, Gene Bianco, David Davis, Peter Dimitriades, Regis Iandiorio, Theodore Israel, Jesse Levy, Charles Libove, Guy Lumia, Elliot Magaziner, Joe Malin, Richard Maximoff, Elliot Rosoff, Paul Winter - string section
Technical
Sib Chalawick - album design
Alen MacWeeney - photography

References

CTI Records albums
Patti Austin albums
1977 albums
albums produced by Dave Grusin
Albums recorded at Electric Lady Studios